Thode Island is a small ice-covered island situated in the Sulzberger Ice Shelf, located  northwest of Benton Island and  east of Przybyszewski Island in the Marshall Archipelago. The island was first mapped by the United States Geological Survey from surveys and U.S. Navy air photos, 1959–65. Named by Advisory Committee on Antarctic Names for George C. Thode, electronic technician and meteorologist at Byrd Station in 1968.

See also 
 List of Antarctic and sub-Antarctic islands

Islands of Marie Byrd Land